Alexander ("Alex") Eaton Kruger (born 18 November 1963 in Öhringen, Baden-Württemberg) is a retired male decathlete from England, who was born in Germany.

Athletics career
He twice competed for Great Britain at the Summer Olympics (1988 and 1996). Kruger set his personal best (8,131 points) in the men's decathlon in 1995. He represented England, at the 1990 Commonwealth Games in Auckland, New Zealand and four years later represented England at the 1994 Commonwealth Games in Victoria, British Columbia, Canada.

Achievements

References

 

1963 births
Living people
People from Öhringen
Sportspeople from Stuttgart (region)
British decathletes
English decathletes
Athletes (track and field) at the 1988 Summer Olympics
Athletes (track and field) at the 1990 Commonwealth Games
Athletes (track and field) at the 1994 Commonwealth Games
Athletes (track and field) at the 1996 Summer Olympics
Olympic athletes of Great Britain
British male athletes
Commonwealth Games competitors for England